Santi Simone e Giuda (Italian, 'St Simon and St Jude') may refer to the following churches in Italy:

Santi Simone e Giuda, Florence
Santi Simone e Giuda, Mantua
Santi Simone e Giuda, Rome, a deconsecrated church 
Santi Simone e Giuda Taddeo a Torre Angela, a modern parish church and a titular church in Rome
Santi Simone e Giuda, Spoleto

See also